The 13th NKP Salve Challenger Trophy was an Indian domestic cricket tournament that was held in Ahmedabad from 25 October to 28 October 2007. The series involved the domestic teams from India which were India Blue, India Red, and India Green. India Blue defeated India Red by 6 wickets in the final to become the champions of the tournament.

Squads

 Piyush Chawla replaced Murali Kartik in the India Green squad, after he was given rest by the selectors.

Points Table

Matches

Group stage

Final

References

Indian domestic cricket competitions
2007 in sports